The Westchester County Executive is the head of the executive branch of the Westchester County, New York, government. The current county executive is George Latimer. The county executive has power to veto acts of Westchester County Board of Legislators. The Westchester Deputy County Executive serves as the direct subordinate to the County Executive.

History
The office of Westchester County Executive was created in 1937 when voters approved a new county charter giving the county an executive branch to complement the legislative County Board of Supervisors (later the County Board of Legislators).

History of county executives

Westchester County executives since the creation of the position include:

References 

 
Westchester County, New York